Rodney Sooklal (born 21 December 1980) is a Trinidadian cricketer. He played in ten first-class and nineteen List A matches for Trinidad and Tobago from 1999 to 2005.

See also
 List of Trinidadian representative cricketers

References

External links
 

1980 births
Living people
Trinidad and Tobago cricketers